Daniel Chien-Meng May (born 1973, Penang, Malaysia) is an Australian tech entrepreneur, author, co-founder of LIFX, and organiser of the inaugural Launch48 Australia events in Sydney and Melbourne.

Biography
May was born in Penang, Malaysia, and immigrated with his family to Australia at age nine. He completed his high schooling at Melbourne High School, before undertaking studies at Monash University. May's first journal article, "Modeling Activities in C++" was published in 1994 when he was twenty-one years old. He later completed a PhD in Software Development on a scholarship at the University of Southern Denmark (literally South Danish University, abbr. SDU).

May is best known as the co-founder and CIO of LIFX, the original LED smart lighting bulb. The LIFX Kickstarter campaign is recorded as one of the most successful. Forbes records a total of US$1.3 million raised in three days, while the Huffington Post notes the timeframe as six days.

In 2014, May joined Matthew Zwolenski (CTO Aust-NZ, EMC), Colin Fairweather, and Rod Tucker as expert panelists in big-data, smart cities, advanced broadband networks, and smart devices at 
2020: Smart Cities, Zettabyte Data and 200 billion things. May's contribution to the understanding of The Internet of Things, sustaining future smart and sustainable industries, is also present in his published writings that cover diverse topics such as organisational culture and knowledge management to "Designing for the Digitally Pervasive World".

In 2015, May was keynote speaker at Stora Tillväxtdagen after acting as a key advisor to the Skellefteå Municipality, an industrial hub in the regional north of Sweden wanting to kick-start startup and innovation activity. May was also keynote Startups & Innovation speaker at StarsConf in Santiago, Chile, in 2017.

Selected publications
 "Knowledge management with patterns" (with P Taylor), Association for Computing Machinery 
 "Activities: Abstractions for collective behavior" (with B Kristensen)
 "Tangible Objects-Modeling in Style" (with B Kristensen, P Nowack)
 "Tango: Modeling in style" (with B Kristensen, P Nowack)
 "Habitats for the digitally pervasive world" (with BB Kristensen)
 "Component composition and interaction" (with B Kristensen)
 "Looking at Knowledge in Three Dimensions: An Holistic Approach to DSS Through Knowledge Management" (with R Meredith, J Piorun)
 "Building the Cultural Artifacts of the Organization."
 "Tango: Designing for the digitally pervasive world"
 "Reality-Virtuality Continuum Systems Empowered with Pervasive and Ubiquitous Computing Technology: Combination and Integration of Real World and Model Systems" (with BB Kristensen, LK Jensen, C Gersbo-Møller, P Nowack)
 "Collaboration and Modeling in Ambient Systems: Vision, Concepts and Experiments" (with BB Kristensen, P Nowack)
 "Software Engineering of Ambient Systems: A Symbiosis of Mixed Reality and Ubiquitous Computing" (with BB Kristensen, P Nowack)
 "Looking at Knowledge in Three Dimensions" (with R Meredith, J Piorun)
 "Modeling with Activities: Abstractions for Collective Behavior" (with BB Kristensen)
 "Beyond Playing with Lego Bricks: Modeling Interaction Between Behavioral Artifacts" (With Bb Kristensen, P Nowack)
 "Conceptual Abstraction in Modeling with Physical and Informational Material" (with BB Kristensen, P Nowack)
 "Virtual Applications:: Applications with Virtual Inhabited 3D Worlds"
 "Supporting complexity through (informational and physical) collaboration and modeling" (with BB Kristensen, P Nowack)
 "Patterns for Building a Beautiful Company" (with L Rising, S Sanchez, C King)

References

1973 births
Living people
Businesspeople from Melbourne
People from Penang
Technology company founders
21st-century Australian businesspeople
People educated at Melbourne High School
University of Southern Denmark alumni
Monash University alumni
Malaysian emigrants to Australia